Deborah Griffin  is a pioneer of the growth of women's rugby, both in England and globally.

Biography 
Griffin took up the sport of rugby at university in the 1970s, and also played rugby with the Richmond Women's Rugby Club. She was a co-founder of England's Rugby Football Union for Women in 1983, an organisation for which she later served as the chair.  She also was one of the principal organisers of the 1991 Women's Rugby World Cup, the first ever Women's Rugby World Cup, which was run despite having no support or financial backing from the International Rugby Board. Griffin later became the first female elected board member of the England Rugby Football Union in 2014.

Griffin was appointed an Officer of the Order of the British Empire (OBE) in the 2011 Birthday Honours for services to Women's Rugby.

In April 2018, Griffin became the first female member of the RFU to be elected to the World Rugby Council.

She currently splits her time in between Cambridge and Twickenham, and has two children, Victoria and Laurence who reside in New York and London respectively.

World Rugby Hall of Fame 
Griffin and the women who organised the first Women's Rugby World Cup in Wales, were inducted into the World Rugby Hall of Fame in a special ceremony during the 2021 Rugby World Cup semi-finals at Eden Park on 5 November 2022.

References

Living people
English rugby union players
English female rugby union players
Officers of the Order of the British Empire
Year of birth missing (living people)